Asli Kandi (also Romanized as Aşlī Kandī; also known as Aşlī Kand, Aşlī Kand-e Bālā, and Aşl Kand) is a village in Yekanat Rural District, Yamchi District, Marand County, East Azerbaijan Province, Iran. At the 2006 census, its population was 103, in 17 families.

References 

Populated places in Marand County